The scaled antbird (Drymophila squamata) is a species of bird in the family Thamnophilidae. It is endemic to Brazil.

Its natural habitats are subtropical or tropical moist lowland forest and heavily degraded former forest.

References

External links
Image at ADW

scaled antbird
Birds of the Atlantic Forest
Endemic birds of Brazil
scaled antbird
Taxonomy articles created by Polbot